Joaquin Tack-Fang (born 23 September 1946) is a Cuban fencer. He competed in the team sabre event at the 1968 Summer Olympics.

References

1946 births
Living people
Cuban male fencers
Olympic fencers of Cuba
Fencers at the 1968 Summer Olympics
Sportspeople from Guantánamo